Ibex Peak (Arizona), at , is a highpoint in the northern section of the Plomosa Mountains of western Arizona, near the Colorado River. The mountain range is a north-south range on the east side of the north-south La Posa Plain which parallels the Colorado River and the river valley of Parker Valley.

References

Mountains of Arizona
Landforms of La Paz County, Arizona
Mountains of La Paz County, Arizona